Maksim Vasilyevich Danilin (born 1 September 1979) is a former Russian professional football player.

Club career
He played in the Russian Football National League for FC Sibir Novosibirsk in 2005.

Honours
 Russian Second Division Zone East best defender: 2004.

References

External links
 

1979 births
Living people
Russian footballers
Association football defenders
FC Sibir Novosibirsk players
FC Novokuznetsk players
FC Amur Blagoveshchensk players